The McGregor Trophy is the English Boys Under 16 Open Amateur Stroke-Play Championship. It was founded in 1982.

History
The event was founded as a boys' golf tournament in 1982 at the Radcliffe-on-Trent Golf Club by Roy Case, later to become president of the English Golf Union. The trophy was donated by Matt and Kathy McGregor, former captains of the club. The competition was adopted in 1993 by the English Golf Union as the English Boys Under 16 Open Amateur Stroke-Play Championship. It is now played at various venues around England, but returns to Radcliffe-on-Trent Golf Club at five year intervals reflecting the inauguration of the trophy at this course.

Format
The championship is open to golfers of all nationalities in possession of a playing handicap not exceeding 4.4. Players must be under 16 years of age on 1 January of the year in which the event takes place. It consists of 72 holes of stroke play over three days, 18 holes being played on each of the first two days. After 36 holes, the leading 40 competitors and all those tying for 40th place play a further 36 holes on the third day.

Winners

In 1982 the trophy was played over 36 holes. In 1987, 2001 and 2007 the event was reduced to 54 holes by bad weather.

Source:

Notable winners
A number of golfers who have won the McGregor Trophy have progressed to successful professional careers, including the 2013 U.S. Open champion Justin Rose, Edoardo Molinari, who played in the 2010 Ryder Cup, and European Tour winners Jim Payne, Steve Webster, Graeme Storm,  and Oliver Fisher.

References

External links
England Golf web site

Junior golf tournaments
Amateur golf tournaments in the United Kingdom
Golf tournaments in England
1982 establishments in England
Recurring sporting events established in 1982